Mount McMinn Station is a pastoral lease that operates as a cattle station in the Northern Territory of Australia.

Location

Description
Both the Roper River and Hodgson River run through the property.

History
The station was acquired by the Cahill family, the founders of Cahill Transport, in 2005 when they bought it from the Mackay family for 3.55 million. In 2018 the Cahills placed the property on the market when it was stocked with over 3,000 head of Brahman cattle.

See also
List of ranches and stations

References

Stations (Australian agriculture)
Pastoral leases in the Northern Territory